2MASS J1155-7919 b is a gas giant exoplanet discovered in 2020. It is roughly 10 times the mass of Jupiter and is 330 light years away from Earth.

References

Exoplanets discovered in 2020
Gas giants